Sundaresan Ramamurthy (born February 2, 1938) better known as Kathadi Ramamurthy, is an Indian actor, director, writer and dubbing artiste. He is primarily known for his roles as a comedian in Tamil film, theatre and television.

Early life 

Born in Kumbakonam to S.Sundaresa Iyer, Ramamurthy studied at Madras and graduated from the Vivekananda College in 1958. Right from his college days, Ramamurthy had a love for drama. His plays were popular and he won many awards. He through his troupe gave first opportunity to many future legends including Cho Ramaswamy , Visu , Delhi Ganesh and Crazy Mohan among others. After playing a cartoonist named Kathadi in the Cho Ramaswamy play If I Get It, he became permanently known as Kathadi Ramamurthy.

Filmography

Television

Films 
This is a partial filmography. You can expand it.

Dubbing artist

References

External links 
 Soaring kite

Living people
Actors in Tamil theatre
Tamil comedians
Tamil dramatists and playwrights
Tamil male television actors
Television personalities from Tamil Nadu
Male actors from Tamil Nadu
People from Thanjavur district
Male actors in Tamil cinema
Indian male dramatists and playwrights
Indian male comedians
Screenwriters from Tamil Nadu
20th-century Indian male actors
1938 births
University of Madras alumni